Fredonia High School may refer to any of the following:

 Fredonia High School (New York) in Fredonia, New York
 Fredonia High School (Arizona) in Fredonia, Arizona
 Fredonia High School (Kansas) in Fredonia, Kansas